A Christmas Visitor is a 2002 American made-for-television drama film starring William Devane, Meredith Baxter and Dean McDermott. It was written by George Samerjan and David Saperstein, and directed by Christopher Leitch.

Plot summary
The film concerns the story of the Boyajian family, who have not celebrated Christmas in 11 years, since their son John was killed shortly before Christmas in 1991 during the Gulf War. With their daughter Jeanie potentially facing a life-threatening illness, George decides they should once again celebrate Christmas; however, Carol adamantly refuses.

George heads to watch over the town's veterans memorial and is accosted by several teenage punks, who are scared off by "Matthew", a hitchhiker passing through town. As Matthew and George talk, Matthew claims to be a Gulf veteran who is the same age as John and served in the same regiment as John, although the two did not apparently know each other.

George invites Matthew to spend Christmas with his family, asking him to tell his wife and daughter that he knew John while they served together. George's ultimate plan is to get the family to once again celebrate Christmas, which works. But as Matthew makes up stories about himself and John, George begins to wonder about Matthew's true identity when his stories include details that only John would have known (including a notable surgical scar from an athletic injury).

At the end, it is revealed that Matthew is actually John making a supernatural visit (by revealing the scar mentioned earlier) in order to restore the family's Christmas spirit.

Cast
 William Devane as George Boyajian
 Meredith Baxter as Carol Boyajian
 Dean McDermott as "Matthew"/John Boyajian
 Reagan Pasternak as Jeanie Boyajian
 Aaron Ashmore as John Boyajian
 Riley Chitty as Jeanie Boyjian (11 yr old)
 Richard Blackburn as Larry Williamson
 Judy Sinclair as Mary Simpson
 Mung-Ling Tsui as Dr. Ortiz
 Johnathan Whittaker as Tom
 Frank McAnulty as Artie
 Craig Eldridge as Lester
 Joan Gregson as Miss Kearney
 Lindy Booth as Liz
source:

See also 
 List of Christmas films

References

External links
 
 A Christmas Visitor at Hallmark Movies & Mysteries

2002 television films
2002 films
2000s Christmas drama films
American Christmas drama films
Christmas television films
Hallmark Channel original films
Sonar Entertainment films
American drama television films
2000s English-language films
Films directed by Christopher Leitch
2000s American films